Lavric or Lavrič is a gender-neutral Slavic surname that may refer to:
Elena Mirela Lavric (born 1991), Romanian runner
Florica Lavric (1962–2014), Romanian rower
Paula Lavric (born 1990), Romanian writer
Sorin Lavric (born 1967), Romanian writer
Karel Lavrič (1818–1876), Slovene politician 
Klemen Lavrič (born 1981), Slovene football striker